Kaiman may refer to:

Kaiman, lead ship of the Kaiman-class torpedo boats
Kaiman, lead ship of the Kaiman-class submarines
Moisés Kaiman (1913–2012), Polish-born Mexican rabbi
Jonathan Kaiman American journalist

See also
Caiman (disambiguation)